The men's middleweight event was part of the boxing programme at the 1960 Summer Olympics in Rome, Italy. The weight class allowed boxers of up to 75 kilograms to compete. The competition was held from 26 August to 5 September 1960. A total of 25 boxers from 25 nations competed.

Competition format

The competition was a straight single-elimination tournament, with no bronze medal match (two bronze medals were awarded, one to each semifinal loser).

Results

Results of the middleweight boxing competition.

Top half

Bottom half

Finals

References

Middleweight